Archery at the 1995 Southeast Asian Games was held at Football Field, Chiang Mai University, Chiang Mai, Thailand.  The archery was held between December 11 to December 15.

Medal table

Medal summary

Men

Women

References
CMSOC (1995) 18th SEA Games Official Report, Thailand

1995 Southeast Asian Games events
Archery at the Southeast Asian Games
Southeast Asian Games
International archery competitions hosted by Thailand